Faxiangyan is a subdistrict of Wugang City in Hunan, China. It was one of four subdistricts approved to establish in 1994 and officially created in 2011. The subdistrict of Shuiximen  has 14 villages and 3 communities under its jurisdiction. Its seat is Nanta Village.

History
The subdistrict of Shuiximen was approved to establish from a part of the former Chengguan Town and three villages of Nanta, Xinlong and Dongshan of the former Faxiangyan Township in 1994. state owned Wugang Forest Farm was incorporated to the subdistrict.

Amalgamation of villages in 2016

Subdivisions
Through the amalgamation of villages in 2016, the number of villages was reduced to 14 from 23, the subdistrict of Shuiximen has 3 communities and 14 villages under its jurisdiction.

14 villages
 Chang'an Village
 Chunguang Village
 Dejiang Village
 Dongting Village
 Dushan Village
 Gaoqiao Village
 Hongxing Village
 Nanta Village
 Qingshuiting Village
 Shuangtian Village
 Xinglong Village
 Xinze Village
 Zhengjiaping Village
 Zitian Village

3 communities
 Faxiangyan Community
 Tiyun Community
 Yulong Community

Subdivisions in 2015
In 2015, Anle Township() was merged to the subdistrict of Faxiangyan, the new subdistrict of Shuiximen had 23 villages and 3 communities under it jurisdiction, of which, 3 communities and 6 villages from the former Shuiximen Subdistrict and 17 villages from the former Anle Township.

6 villages and 3 communities of the former Faxiangyan Subdistrict
 FaxiangyanCommunity
 TiyunCommunity
 YulongCommunity
 ChangjielingVillage
 DaongshanVillage
 DongtingVillage
 NantaVillage
 XinglongVillage
 YulongVillage

17 villages of Anle Township
 AnleVillage
 ChangchongVillage
 ChunguangVillage
 DeyunVillage
 DongzhuangVillage
 DushanVillage
 GaoqiaoVillage
 HongxingVillage
 ShuangshiqiaoVillage
 ShuangyongVillage
 TangfuVillage
 TianzhuangVillage
 WuguiVillage
 XiaoshuitingVillage
 XinzeVillage
 ZhengjiapingVillage
 ZitianVillage

References

Wugang, Hunan
Subdistricts of Hunan